The gymnastics competition in the 2001 Summer Universiade were held in Beijing, PR China.

Men's events

Women's Event

Rhythmic Gymnastics

References
 Universiade gymnastics medalists on HickokSports
 Universiade rhythmic gymnastics medalists on HickokSports

2001 in gymnastics
2001 Summer Universiade
Gymnastics at the Summer Universiade